Sankeys is a nightclub franchise with its first nightclub in Ancoats, Manchester, United Kingdom. The company formerly operated a nightclub in Playa d’en Bossa, Ibiza and opened a New York City venue in 2013.

Sankeys Manchester
Sankeys first opened in Manchester as "Sankeys Soap" in June 1994. It was so called due to its residence inside Beehive Mill, Ancoats, which once was used to manufacture soap. The basement of the mill was transformed into a club and live music venue by Andy Spiro and Rupert Campell. After nearly going bankrupt only six months after opening, the venue managed to keep thriving. However, in 1998, due to financial problems, Sankeys Soap closed.

In 2000, the club was revived by business partners David Vincent and Sacha Lord. This time the club was more successful than before, tackling the problems that had crippled its previous owners. In 2006, the club was forced to close once more, much to the dismay of clubbers. David Vincent announced that this time Sankeys Soap would be closed for good.

Later that summer, it was announced that the club was to re-open under the shorter name Sankeys. It would be under the direction of David Vincent who invited Andy Spiro to get involved once again. During its closure the club underwent a major refit involving a brand new LED lighting system and featured the "hatongue" who took over from the legendary "Mad Graham" after the PAR cans were removed. The main DJ booth was also replaced by a new circular box.

In 2009, owing to the success of the new club, 15 further changes were made to celebrate 15 years of the Sankeys dynasty. These included dynamic ceiling lighting in the Spektrum (the upstairs part of the club) as well as a beach constructed with 50 tonnes of Bahamas Sand and the introduction of a state-of-the-art barcoded entry system.  In 2010, Sankeys was voted the number one club in the world in a DJ Mag reader poll.

Following the success of 2010, David Vincent announced plans to create "Seven Sankeys" of the World in the seven cities that inspired the original Sankeys.

The music policy at Sankeys was varied but focused on underground electronic music, mainly House & Techno.  The club also hosted one-off nights from outside promoters.

Resident DJs over the years included Greg Vickers, Bushwacka!, Jozef K, Darius Syrossian, Ellesse, OD Muzique.

On 11 April 2013, Sankeys announced they would be closing the doors again on 6 May 2013.

On 12 November 2013, Sankeys announced on their Ibiza Twitter feed that they would be re-opening Manchester in January 2014.

On 12 January 2017, Sankeys announced that they were permanently closing with immediate effect, after the building they occupied had been sold to be turned into apartments.

Sankeys Ibiza
In May 2011 Sankeys began operations in Playa d’en Bossa, Ibiza. The Venue was the first of the Seven Sankeys of the World venture that David Vincent has embarked upon.

In 2012, Sankeys Ibiza continued successfully for a second season in Ibiza with key residencies at the venue including Viva Warriors fronted by Steve Lawler and Solomun's Diynamic Neon Nights.

During the 2013 Ibiza season at Sankeys, the Seven Wonders of the World theme made a return with parties running seven nights a week. Viva Warriors and Diynamic Neon Nights continued their residencies on Sundays and Tuesdays respectively, alongside Hypercolour on Mondays, FUSE on Wednesdays, dirtybird on Thursdays, Flying Circus on Fridays and Carnival Cities on Saturdays.

Sankeys Ibiza is part of biggest global DJ project, burn Residency that for the 4th year in the row, take place in Ibiza.

In 2018, the nightclub closed.

Sankeys New York
On 31 October 2013, Sankeys New York (Manhattan) opened as the third Sankeys nightclub. It hosted its 3-day opening weekend during Halloween 2013. It was located at 29 W 36th Street, Manhattan, New York, 10018 (previously District 36 nightclub), but closed after less than a year.

On 30 October 2014, Sankeys opened in Brooklyn for Halloween weekend, however this location closed on 20 November 2014, three weeks after opening.

Sankeys TYO
In 2015, Sankeys opened in Tokyo, Japan, in the space vacated by Air nightclub at B1F-B2F, 2-11 Sarugakucho, Shibuya-ku, Tokyo

Sankeys UK

Sankeys Newcastle

On 19 January 2017, a week after the closure of the Manchester club, Sankeys revealed plans to open in Newcastle upon Tyne.

In May 2017, Sankeys revealed the 'Sankeys Newcastle Opening Party (Day & Night - 12 Hour Rave)' would be on 15 July 2017.

Sankeys Birmingham

On 13 May 2017, The Rainbow Venues at 29 Lower Trinity St, Digbeth, Birmingham B9 4AG, hosted an 'All-Day/All-Night Rave'.

Sankeys London
Sankeys doesn't currently have an exclusive venue In London, but has been hosting events at Studio 338, located in East London since at least 2014.

Sankeys Liverpool

Sankeys Stoke

Opening night was 21 October 2017 at the JJ nightclub on Pall Mall, Hanley, Stoke-on-Trent.
It is now closed permanently.

Sankeys Swansea

A new venue was used in May 2022, located in Swansea.

Notable performances
Household names such as Daft Punk, Moby, Björk, and The Chemical Brothers have played at Sankeys, along with artists such as Laurent Garnier, Jacques Lu Cont, Dave Clarke, Mylo, Carl Cox, Derrick May and Swedish House Mafia.

Hugh Cornwell of The Stranglers released an album recorded at Sankeys in 1998, called Mayday.

Awards and nominations

DJ Magazine's top 100 Clubs

International Nightlife Association's Top 100 Clubs

Notes

See also

List of electronic dance music venues

References

Nightclubs in Manchester
Music venues completed in 1994
Music in Manchester
Nightclubs in Ibiza
Electronic dance music venues
1994 establishments in England